WCMX is a sport in which wheelchair athletes perform tricks adapted from skateboarding and BMX, usually performed at a skatepark. It was invented by Aaron Fotheringham.

Overview
The sport has its own competitions and custom wheelchairs.

History
The term WCMX, a mash-up of wheelchair and BMX, was coined by Fotheringham. Fotheringham landed the first wheelchair backflip and the first double backflip.

Australia
Timothy Lachlan was the first Australian to land a wheelchair backflip.

UK
Lily Rice was the first person in the UK to land a backflip. She won her first world championship in September 2019.

The first WCMX meet-up in the UK was in early 2019.

USA
WCMX originated in the US.

Equipment Used
Riders use purpose-built wheelchairs called WCMX chairs to perform various tricks and stunts. Unlike standard daily use wheelchairs, WCMX chairs have a reinforced frame, grind bar, carbon fibre push wheels, skateboard or rollerblade wheels, suspension castors and a seatbelt. The most commonly used safety gear is full-face helmets, elbow and knee pads and gloves. Full-face helmets are preferred as they offer greater protection against falls from any angle. For more dangerous tricks involving flips or mega ramps, riders should wear a neck brace and a chest/back protector to reduce the risk of injury to the spine.

Categories of Tricks
This isn't an exhaustive list, new tricks and variations are created each day.

Air
Backflip, Double Backflip, Front Flip, 180, 360, Flair.

Bowl and Ramp Tricks
Handplant, Carving, Drop-In, Acid Drop, Bank Drop, One Wheel Drop-in, Layback, Blunt Stall, Fakie.

Flat-ground
One wheel spin, Castor Spin, Layback, Duck Walk, Bunny Hop.

Grinds and Slides
50-50 Grind, 5-0 Grind, Footplate/Nosegrind, Hand-rim slide.

Balance
Wheelie, One Wheel Wheelie, No-Handers.

Miscellaneous
Upside-Down Wheelie, Upside-Down One Wheel Spin.

Risks
As with other skatepark sports, the risks involved in WCMX can be greatly reduced by wearing safety gear such as a full-face helmet and pads; and only trying tricks within the rider's skill level. WCMX chairs provide a wide base of support, making falls less likely unless the rider is trying tricks that involve shifting the centre of gravity, e.g. balance tricks such as one-wheel spins.

Culture
The WCMX community is a worldwide community. With riders from a diverse range of cultures and backgrounds, with varying disabilities. The youngest known rider began WCMX at 18 months old, the oldest current rider is in their fifties. There is a growing number of LGBT riders emerging worldwide.

In 2016, an online campaign for a Lego wheelchair skate park was rejected. However, WCMX is represented in the Lego City Skate Park (60290) set, released 2021.

References

External links
2018 WCMX World Championship Rules

Wheelchair sports